Yauheni Paulavich Tsikhantsou (born 4 November 1998) is a Belarusian weightlifter, World Champion and European Champion competing in the 94 kg category until 2018 and 96 kg starting in 2018 after the International Weightlifting Federation reorganized the categories.

Career

World Championships
In 2018 he competed as a junior at the 2018 World Weightlifting Championships in the newly created 96 kg division. He won a bronze medal in the snatch portion with a junior world record setting lift of 180 kg.

European Championships
In 2019 he competed at the 2019 European Weightlifting Championships in the 96 kg category. He made all six lifts in a perfect day, winning gold medals in the snatch, clean & jerk and total, setting European Records in the clean & jerk and total. His total of 400 kg was a full 22 kg over the silver medalist.

Other competitions
In 2018 he competed in the 5th International Qatar Cup winning a silver medal in the snatch, and bronze medals in both the clean & jerk and total.

Major results

References

External links

Living people
1998 births
Belarusian male weightlifters
World Weightlifting Championships medalists
Sportspeople from Gomel
European Weightlifting Championships medalists
Weightlifters at the 2020 Summer Olympics
Olympic weightlifters of Belarus
21st-century Belarusian people